Jean Duval, O.C.D. (22 April 1597 – 10 April 1669) was a Roman Catholic prelate who served as the second Bishop of Baghdad (1638–1669) and Bishop of Ispahan (1638–1669).

Biography
Jean Duval was born in Clamecy, France on 22 April 1597 and was ordained a priest in the Order of Discalced Carmelites. On 16 August 1638, he was appointed during the papacy of Pope Urban VIII as Bishop of Baghdad. On 22 August 1638, he was consecrated bishop by Giovanni Battista Maria Pallotta, Cardinal-Priest of San Silvestro in Capite, with Antonio Severoli, Archbishop of Dubrovnik, and Tommaso Carafa, Bishop Emeritus of Vulturara e Montecorvino, serving as co-consecrators. On 25 September 1638, he was appointed during the papacy of Pope Urban VIII as Bishop of Ispahan. He served as Bishop of Baghdad and Bishop of Ispahan until his death on 10 April 1669.

References 

1597 births
1639 deaths
17th-century Roman Catholic bishops in Safavid Iran
Bishops appointed by Pope Urban VIII
Carmelite bishops